Tough Guys of the Prairie is a 1970 Danish comedy film directed by Carl Ottosen and starring Dirch Passer.

Cast
 Dirch Passer as Jonathan Ignasius Salvatore 'Biggy' Jones
 Paul Hagen as Shorty
 Preben Kaas as Ben
 Willy Rathnov as Sam
 Karl Stegger as Hank Ericson
 Jesper Klein as Art Ericson
 Sisse Reingaard as Katy Ericson
 Miskow Makwarth as Johnson
 Lone Lau as Kari Johnson
 Eva Danné as Sally
 Ove Sprogøe as Judge
 Lars Lunøe as Slim O'Hara
 Hans-Henrik Krause as Gus
 Peer Guldbrandsen as Tucky
 Benny Hansen as Brooke
 Carl Ottosen as Sheriff
 Poul Glargaard as Deputy
 Arne Møller as Bartender
 Bjørn Spiro as Indian Chief

References

External links

1970 films
1970s Danish-language films
Films directed by Carl Ottosen
Films scored by Sven Gyldmark
Danish comedy films
1970s Western (genre) comedy films
1970 comedy films
Danish Western (genre) films